Hermann Ohlicher (born 2 November 1949 in Bräunlingen) is a retired German football player.

He spent ten seasons in the Bundesliga with VfB Stuttgart, playing 318 matches in the West German top-flight.

Honours
VfB Stuttgart
 Bundesliga: 1983–84

References

External links
 
 

1949 births
Living people
German footballers
VfB Stuttgart players
Bundesliga players
2. Bundesliga players
FV Ravensburg players
Association football midfielders
20th-century German people